The South Korean Labor Movement includes the multiple labor movements and organizations that advocates for rights and well being of workers. The  organizations have emerged with differing political ideology and methods on how to achieve their goals. The South Korean Labor Movement is also active in other movements, allowing for solidarity between organizations. The movement originated in the 19th century while under Japanese rule as a way to organize workers. Later the movement developed alongside the growing working class.  The movement employs a variety of methods as a means to bargain. Since its inception multiple unions have been created to advocate for workers.

Origins 
The movement created the first union under colonial Japanese regime in 1910. Named the Seongjin Stevedores Union, it consisted of 47 workers. During this time period unions were limited in their scope as they were small in size and membership. Due to this unions were limited to occupational unions and regional based ones. It is during this time that differing ideology in the labor movement could be seen in the form of a pro Korean Identity and a pro Japanese Identity. The labor movement at this time was able to organize regional strikes as opposed to spontaneous revolts.

History

Post 1945 
In November 1945 socialists formed Chun Pyung also known as the General Council of Korea Trade Unions (GCKTU) . Initial membership for the GCKTU was 180,000 workers and eventually grew to 553,408 members within two months. During August 1945 and February 1948 the GCKTU held over 3000 strikes which resulted in the deaths of 25 people and imprisoned 11,000. The fallout from the strikes led to the creation of a labor department created by the American military, which restricted union political activity. To protest this restriction, the GCKTU called for renewed strikes known as the September National Strikes, but failed to achieve anything significant, which led to the GCKTU being banned . In an effort to oppose the GCKTU a right wing trade union known as Daehan Dogrib Chockseong Nodong Chongyeonmyeng or the General Federation of Korean Trade Unions (GFKTU) was formed in March 1946. The ban of the GCKTU led to the GFKTU to become the sole representative of Korean trade unions. The GFKTU was later named to the Federation of Korean Trade Unions (FKTU).

Federation of Korean Trade Unions 
The FKTU or Federation of Korean Trade Unions was formed in March 1946 as an effort to oppose the left leaning GCKTU. The formation of the FKTU had two goals, to support the conservative government and to oppose left leaning labor movements. The FKTU opposed many of the strikes the GCKTU conducted by attributing them as a means to gain political power. When the GCKTU was banned, the FKTU was the sole trade union, it represented South Korea in International Confederation of Free trade Unions in December 1949. In 1952 President Syngman Rhee took control of the union and incorporated into the Liberal Party. In 1953 the Labor Standards Act, the Labor Union Act and the Labor disputes adjustment act were passed by the government. The Labor Standards Act guaranteed an eight-hour work day.  In April 1960 President Syngman Rhee was removed from his position by the student movement which led to the FKTU dissolve all ties with the Labor Party. In April 1971, the FKTU established the Committee on political Education (COPE) as a way to educated members on political issues and help political campaigns that supported workers' rights.

Chun Tae-il  
Chun Tae-il was an activist who was most known for his act of martyrdom. Chun formed a group known as the Fool's Organization as a means to fight for the better treatment of workers. They reported problems such as illegal working conditions or other offenses that violated the Labor Standards Act to government officials . Spurred by the ineffectiveness of the government to improve working conditions, Chun Tae-il committed suicide by lighting himself on fire as a means of protest. Chun's actions inspired others to do the same. This method is one of the most extreme methods the labor movement employs.

Gwangju Uprising  
The Gwangju Uprising served as the first step towards democracy in South Korea .

The Gwangju Uprising refers to the events that took place in May 1980. Although the movement was conceived by students, overtime the working class made up a bulk of the participants. The events at this uprising led to the death of at least 164 people. Statistics for this event can vary from sources due to alleged coverups, where bodies were burned or dumped into the ocean and unmarked graves.

On May 14, 1980, a student demonstration involving over 70,000 people sought to express their grievances against the authoritarian government.  On May 17, the government arrested the leaders of the student movement as a way to stop the movement. On May 18, paratroopers were sent to confront the protesters and escalated the situation. What resulted was a massive slaughter of citizens which united “workers, farmers, students, and people from all walks of life” to oppose the government. On May 27, 1980 the uprising was put down.

June Struggle 
The June Struggle also known as the Democratization Movement for 19 days in multiple cities were protesting for democracy. The Gwangju Uprising paved the way for student and worker solidarity which were instrumental for a democratic transition. A large number of people were arrested during the struggle, most of whom were laborers. In efforts to avoid another uprising, the government allowed for elections and democratic reforms.

Great Worker Struggle 
During the democratization transition of Korea, In July and August 1987 over three million workers, inspired by the June struggle, led to an uprising of workers demanding for better wages, better working condition, and autonomous trade unions. Autonomous trade unions were an important goal as “no legal independent unions existed” as the FKTU was “loyal to the government”. The Great Worker Struggle failed to achieve much as it coincide with the democratization event.

Korean Confederation of Trade Unions (KCTU)  
On November 13, 1994 the groundwork for a new union to oppose the FKTU was created . Inspired by the Great Worker Struggle leaders of this union adopted the strategy of militant unionism as a way or bargaining. In order to be more effective regional cooperation with other unions was key in creating a new union, what followed was the formation of the Council of National Democratic Unions . In 1995 the Korean Confederation of Trade Unions (KCTU) emerged from the council. The KCTU represented the: automobile industry, shipbuilding industry, heavy industries, public transport sector, and white collar workers . In 1997 launched its first strike in order to protest the passage of the bills that limited workers' rights. Later the KCTU was able to negotiate for its semi legal status.

General Strike of 1997  
In December 1996 the National Assembly attempted to pass two laws that would limit workers' rights. These laws would have made it easier for the firing of workers and allowed the use of strikebreakers. In response to this workers responded en masse by walking off their jobs. By the third day the walk off amounted to 350,00 workers and stopped most of Korea's industrial production . On January 3, FKTU leaders met with KCTU leaders to create a united front. On January 15, the number of people who walked out of the jobs peaked at one million workers . On January 16 the government conceded and affirmed the bills would be sent back for revision . In March the laws were revised and the KCTU achieved semi legal status.

Methods 
The South Korean Labor Movement employed a variety of methods in order to negotiate. These included strikes, protests, hunger protests, self immolation, violence, kidnapping, and the occupation of buildings.

See also 
 GwangJu Uprising
 Korean Confederation of Trade Unions
 Jeon Tae-il
 Federation of Korean Trade Unions
 Liberalism in South Korea
 Socialism in South Korea

References 

Labor in South Korea